Jaelyn  or  Jaelynn, and its masculine equivalent, Jaylin, is an American given name.  The meaning of the name Jaelyn is supplanter, and the origin of the name is American.  It is a contraction of the female given name Jacqueline.

People

Jaylin Bosak (born 1998), American soccer player
Jaylin Davis (born 1994), American baseball player
Jaelyn Duncan (born 2000), American football player
Jaylin Lindsey (born 2000), American soccer player
Jaylin Williams (born 2002), American basketball player
Jaelyn Young, American convicted of terrorist charges

See also 
 List of people starting with "Jaelyn"
 Jaylen, given name

References

Given names